Nkanya  Nkwai (born 3 July 1982) is an English-speaking Cameroonian film actor, director and  producer. He was recognized in 2014 by the Ecrans Noirs in Yaounde, Cameroon in the movie Viri as best actor, making him the first Anglophone Cameroonian to merit such an award. He is the producer  of the movie Nightfall ( Tombee De La Nuit) featuring Nollywood actor Clem Ohameze and Cameroonian star Epule Jeffrey.

Early life
Nkanya, was born in Dumbo-Berabe, Donga Mantung Division  in Cameroon into a polygamous family. He went to Presbyterian primary School  (PS) Dumbo-Berabe and Government High School (GHS) Ako, where he completed at Government Bilingual High School in Nkambe with a G.C.E Advanced Level Certificate and later on enrolled at University of Yaoundé I, a crash programme in South Africa. He moved to  LCC International University in Lithuania. As a young man, he lived and grew up in Idenau a suburb of Limbe town, in Cameroon.

Career 
His movie debut came in 2008, in the movie Becky Diana. He left Cameroon for  further  studies  abroad. In 2010, he performed a role in The Crucible by  LCC International University in Lithuania. After his return to Cameroon, he featured in several movies that include Viri,  The African Guest, Nightfall and Life Point.

References

External links 
 

Cameroonian male actors
Cameroonian film producers
Living people
Cameroonian film directors
Cameroonian women film directors
Cameroonian women film producers
1982 births